Lervik is a village in the municipality of Fredrikstad, Norway, located by the Oslofjord. The population of Lervik is 2,393 (2008). In the summer, a lot of tourists comes to Lervik, mainly from Oslo and Bærum.

References

Fredrikstad
Villages in Østfold